The Days That Confused is a 2016 Estonian comedy-drama film directed by Triin Ruumet. The film stars Hendrik Toompere Jr. Jr. and Klaudia Tiitsmaa.

Plot
Allar (Hendrik Toompere Jr. Jr.), a disaffected man from rural Estonia is on a frantic journey through midsummer Estonia in the late 1990s trying to discover purpose and meaning in his life.

Cast 

 Hendrik Toompere Jr. Jr. as Allar 
 Juhan Ulfsak as Juulius
 Jaanika Arum as Nele
 Taavi Eelmaa as Pontu
 Klaudia Tiitsmaa as Maria
 Juss Haasma as Mattias
 Liina Vahtrik as Maarika
 Kait Kall	as Pets
 Kristjan Lüüs as Andres
 Reimo Sagor as Toomas
 Kethi Uibomägi as Riina
 Merlyn Uusküla as	Jaana
 Ott Aardam as	Herko
 Igor Maasik as Uncle Bella
 Katariina Tamm as Katariina
 Kaisa Selde as Kaisa
 Rita Kender as Merli
 Joosep Jürgenson as Young Uncle Bella
 Henry Mandel as Maarek
 Liina Vahtrik	as Maarika
 Hendrik Toompere Jr. as Jaak
 Merle Palmiste as Mari
 Margus Prangel as Aivo
 Markus Dvinjaninov as Lauri
 Ingrid Margus as Marta
 Andres Maimik as Margus
 Viiu Maimik as Grandmother
 Hela Kindsiveer as Volleyball Coach

References

External links 

2016 comedy-drama films
Estonian comedy-drama films